Challhuacocha (possibly from Quechua challwa fish, qucha lake, "fish lake") is a lake in Peru located in the Ancash Region, Pallasca Province, Conchucos District. It lies southeast of Lake Pelagatos, northwest of the lake named Labrascocha (possibly from Quechua Lawrasqucha) and north of the village of Challuacocha (possibly from Quechua Challwaqucha).

A little river named Challhuacocha connects the lake with the town of Conchucos in the southwest.

References 

Lakes of Peru
Lakes of Ancash Region